Zou Lunlun is a player and teacher of the guzheng, a Chinese zither.  

She is fourth-generation guzheng player in a family of musicians. She has performed concerts in Vienna and Sydney, and performed for China's President Jiang Zemin and Australian Prime Minister John Howard. 

While she lived in Australia, Lunlun established a Chinese traditional music group, "3 Sisters", with pipa player (Lulu Liu), and erhu player (Yingying Liu).

She has recorded a CD called Spring Hope by the Art Tune Recording Company of Hong Kong. She currently performs and teaches in Hong Kong.

References

External links
Lunlun Zou's site about guzheng (includes music video clips)
Lunlun Zou's 3 Girls' Band

Year of birth missing (living people)
Living people
Guzheng players
Hong Kong artists
Hong Kong musicians
People's Republic of China musicians
Hong Kong women artists